Sterba Propellers, also called Ed Sterba Propellers, Sterba Propeller Company and Edward Sterba Aircraft Propellers was founded by Edward Sterba. It is an American manufacturer of wooden propellers for homebuilt and ultralight aircraft. The company headquarters is located in Holmes Beach, Florida.

The company specializes in propellers for Volkswagen air-cooled engines used in aircraft for recreational flying and air racing.

See also
List of aircraft propeller manufacturers

References

External links 
Official website archives on archive.org

Aircraft propeller manufacturers
Aerospace companies of the United States
Companies based in Manatee County, Florida
Manufacturing companies of the United States
Manufacturing companies based in Florida